Overdoz (stylized as OverDoz.) is an American hip hop group from the Crenshaw District of Los Angeles, California. The group is composed of vocalist and rapper Kent Jamz, rapper Joon, rapper P and comedian Cream. The group formed in the summer of 2008 and are currently signed to RCA Records and Polo Grounds Music. Overdoz has collaborated with several prominent artists in the hip hop industry, such as Kendrick Lamar, Pharrell Williams, A$AP Rocky, A$AP Ferg, Childish Gambino, Juicy J, The Internet, Flatbush Zombies, Dom Kennedy, Casey Veggies, Nipsey Hussle and Skeme.

Musical career
Overdoz. released their first mixtape Bowties and Rosaries in 2008, followed by Nova in 2010, Live For, Die For in 2011, and Boom in 2013. The group independently released their single “Lauren London” in 2012, which currently has over 1,000,000 plays on YouTube, followed by “Killer Tofu” in 2013. In 2015, Overdoz. dropped three singles “Rich White Friends,” “F**k Yo DJ" featuring A$AP Ferg, and “Last Kiss,” which was produced by and featured Pharrell Williams on guest vocals. The group released their debut studio album 2008 in 2017.
On October 13, 2017, the group released the song "District" along with the accompanying music video directed by long time collaborator CALMATIC.

Discography

Studio albums

Mixtapes

Singles

As lead artist

References

External links
 
 
 

Hip hop groups from California
RCA Records artists
Musical groups established in 2008
African-American musical groups
Musical quartets
Musical groups from Los Angeles
Alternative hip hop groups